Yowlqonluy-e Qadim (also Romanized as Yowlqonlūy-e Qadīm; also known as Kegna Yulghūnli, Kegna Yurgakli, Kohneh Kand, Yolghoonlooé Ghadim, Yowlqūnlū-ye Qadīm, and Yūlqūnlū-ye Qadīm) is a village in Gavdul-e Gharbi Rural District, in the Central District of Malekan County, East Azerbaijan Province, Iran. At the 2006 census, its population was 578, in 156 families.

References 

Populated places in Malekan County